Bruce Nunatak is a nunatak which lies  west of Donald Nunatak in the Seal Nunataks group, off the east coast of the Antarctic Peninsula. It was first charted in 1902 by the Swedish Antarctic Expedition under Otto Nordenskiöld, who named it for Dr. William S. Bruce, the leader of the Scottish National Antarctic Expedition, 1902–04.

References 

Nunataks of Graham Land
Oscar II Coast